Reginald Gordon "Reg" Wyatt (18 September 1932 – 16 November 2007) was an English footballer who played as a centre back.

He began his career with Oak Villa (now known as Vospers Oak Villa), a non-league (now the South West Peninsula League) club in Plymouth, while studying at the Astor Institute. He became a professional in 1950 when he signed for Plymouth Argyle, but had to wait five years before making his first team debut. Originally a forward, Wyatt forced his way into the team as a centre back and went on to be a regular name on the teamsheet for the next nine years. He spent three years with Torquay United between 1964 and 1967, before finishing his career in non-league football with Wadebridge Town.

References

1932 births
2007 deaths
Footballers from Plymouth, Devon
English footballers
Association football central defenders
Plymouth Argyle F.C. players
Torquay United F.C. players
English Football League players
Wadebridge Town F.C. players